The Official Opposition Shadow Cabinet in Canada is composed of members of the main opposition party, His Majesty's Loyal Opposition, and is responsible for holding the Government to account and for developing and disseminating the party's policy positions. Members of the official opposition are generally referred to as opposition critics, but the term Shadow Minister (which is generally used in other Westminster systems) is also used.

By Parliament 
The membership of the Shadow Cabinet in various parliaments may be found in the following articles:
 Official Opposition Shadow Cabinet of the 39th Parliament of Canada
 Official Opposition Shadow Cabinet of the 40th Parliament of Canada
 Official Opposition Shadow Cabinet of the 41st Parliament of Canada
 Official Opposition Shadow Cabinet of the 42nd Parliament of Canada
 Official Opposition Shadow Cabinet of the 43rd Parliament of Canada
 Official Opposition Shadow Cabinet of the 44th Parliament of Canada

Current 
The current shadow cabinet is composed of members of the Conservative Party, led by Pierre Poilievre.

See also 
 New Democratic Party Shadow Cabinet of the 42nd Parliament of Canada

External links 
 Current Opposition Shadow Cabinet list at Conservative Party website

House of Commons of Canada